American Fork Canyon is a canyon in the Wasatch Mountains of Utah, United States. The canyon is famous for the Timpanogos Cave National Monument, which resides on its south side. It is named after the American Fork River, which runs through the bottom of the canyon.

The area is accessed by State Route 92, through what is officially called the "Alpine Loop Scenic Byway." Visitors entering American Fork Canyon from the west can follow SR-92 up the canyon to the summit of the Alpine Loop, down the east side of Mount Timpanogos, past Sundance Ski Resort and then out into Provo Canyon to the south. Spurs off SR-92 take visitors to Tibble Fork Reservoir and Cascade Springs. A well-maintained gravel road continues east from Cascade Springs to Midway.

This area is home to many hiking, biking, and equestrian trails with several established campgrounds. Tibble Fork Reservoir and Silver Lake Flats Reservoir are popular camping and fishing spots in the summer as well as offering excellent snowmobiling, snowshoeing, cross-country skiing, and backcountry skiing during the winter months.

Recreation Fee Demonstration Project
American Fork Canyon is part of the Recreation Fee Demonstration Project. The fees collected at the entrance stations remain in the area to improve visitor services, maintain recreation facilities, enhance wildlife habitat, and protect natural resources. As of July 2019, fees for the canyon are as follows:
 $6.00 per vehicle for three days
 $12.00 per vehicle for seven days
 $45.00 per vehicle for an annual pass

The access passes for the Alpine Scenic Loop are transferable to the Mirror Lake Recreation Corridor.  Beginning in 2013, visitors going just to Timpanogos Cave National Monument are not required to pay the entrance fee to the canyon (unless other recreational facilities are also utilized).

American Fork Canyon Camping sites
 Altamont
 Granite Flat
 Holman Flat
 Little Mill
 Mount Timpanogos
 North Mill
 Salamander Flat
 Theatre-in-the-Pines
 Timpooneke

See also

 List of canyons and gorges in Utah

References

External links

 American Fork Canyon, MSS P 406 at L. Tom Perry Special Collections, Harold B. Lee Library, Brigham Young University

Canyons and gorges of Utah
Canyons and gorges of Utah County, Utah
Wasatch Front
Tourist attractions in Utah County, Utah
Wasatch-Cache National Forest
Wasatch Range